Thomas Kirkby (fl. 1391–1411), of Kingston upon Hull, Yorkshire, was an English politician and merchant.

Career
Kirkby was a merchant of wool and cloth.

He was a Member (MP) of the Parliament of England for Kingston upon Hull 1391, 1393, 1394, 1395, January 1397, 1402, 1406 and 1411.

References

14th-century births
15th-century deaths
English MPs 1391
English MPs 1393
14th-century English businesspeople
15th-century English businesspeople
Politicians from Kingston upon Hull
English MPs 1394
English MPs 1395
English MPs January 1397
English MPs 1402
English MPs 1406
English MPs 1411